HEPC may refer to:
Hepatitis C, a disease
Hepcidin, a peptide hormone
Hydrogenated egg phosphatidylcholine
Haryana Environment Protection Council, India